Gladstone Guest (26 June 1917 – 17 July 1998) was an English footballer.

Through Guest's ten years at Rotherham he managed 358 league appearances and 130 league goals, this made him Rotherham United's record league goal scorer.

References

1917 births
1998 deaths
Rotherham United F.C. players
Watford F.C. wartime guest players
English footballers
English Football League players
Association football forwards
Gainsborough Trinity F.C. managers
English football managers